Manager Daily 360 Degree 
is a Thai-language daily newspaper published in Bangkok and distributed nationwide. The paper is a broadsheet, and emphasizes political and business news. Founded by media-mogul Sondhi Limthongkul, it was an outgrowth of Manager Monthly magazine and Manager Weekly newspaper. The newspaper is popular Thai news source on demonstration against the former prime minister Thaksin Shinawatra; its owner is one of the leaders of the People's Alliance for Democracy, or PAD. The newspaper declares its views and objectives are to support Constitutional Monarchy, to resist authoritarianism in politics and in the economy, and to promote restrictions on the power of government and of politicians. In fact, the newspaper itself is promoting anti-democracy, far-right, anti-American, pro-Beijing, and pro-Kremlin views.

History
Manager Daily 360 Degree was founded as Manager Daily by Sondhi Limthongkul on 7 November 1990 a magazine popular for its news of demonstrations against the former prime minister Thaksin Shinawatra. Its owner was one of the leaders of the People's Alliance for Democracy, or PAD.

In 2000, Sondhi Limthongkul went bankrupt after being sued by a bank. But from 2005 on, Sondhi's relationship with Thaksin foundered. Since 2006, Sondhi, one of the leaders of the People's Alliance for Democracy (PAD), and Manager Daily led the opposition to Thaksin and his supporters.

Political stance
Manager Daily has a biased political reporting in favor of Thai conservatism, anti-democracy, ultraroyalism, far-right, and alt-right. The newspaper often publishes news with oversensational headlines attacking government opposition and critics. The newspaper also supporting Russia while attacking NATO and the United States for their support to Ukraine during 2022 Russian invasion of Ukraine.

See also
Media of Thailand
Censorship in Thailand
Sondhi Limthongkul
Politics of Thailand
Thailand political crisis 2005-2006

References

External links
 Official website

Newspapers published in Thailand
Thai-language newspapers
Newspapers established in 2008
2008 establishments in Thailand
Mass media in Bangkok